St Aloysius' College is a selective fee-paying, independent,  Jesuit day school in Glasgow, Scotland. It was founded in 1859 by the Jesuits, who previously staffed the college, and named after Saint Aloysius Gonzaga. Its strong Jesuit ethos emphasises practice of the Roman Catholic faith both in the church and in the community, with many charitable and community-based groups in the school although there are no Jesuits now in the school.

St Aloysius' College is a co-educational school with a kindergarten, junior school, and senior school. There are four houses: Aloysius Gonzaga, Ignatius of Loyola, John Ogilvie and Francis Xavier, named after Jesuit saints.

The College motto is Ad majora natus sum, which means "I am born for greater things". As in many Jesuit schools, pupils are instructed to inscribe AMDG (Ad Majorem Dei Gloriam – "To the greater glory of God") on all work. The school emblem is an eagle, and the College hymn is the Carmen Aloisianum.

History

Foundation
The school was  established on 12 September 1859 at Charlotte Street, near Glasgow Green, in the East End of Glasgow. Here lived the city's largely migrant Catholic community from Ireland and the Scottish Highlands, both of which groups the school was intended to serve. Since 1866 the College's main campus has been situated in Garnethill on the north side of Glasgow city centre, adjacent to the Glasgow School of Art. Originally, the school was for boys only. In 1979 the admission policy was changed by the Governors during the tenure of  Headmaster Fr. Henry Anthony Richmond SJ and girls were admitted. Girls now make up half of the school population.

Buildings
Buildings include the original category-B listed Italianate Chandlery Building, including the administration block, library, and refectory. Its 1908 and 1926 extensions are known collectively as The Hanson Building, which accommodates classrooms for languages and the humanities as well as the school chapel and gymnasium.

The Mount Building, which originally housed the city's first Royal Hospital for Sick Children from 1882, and  until recently housed the junior school (whose patron is St John Ogilvie), today houses music, art and drama, and the kindergarten.

More modern additions include the Clavius Building housing the Mathematics, Science, and Technology faculty and the Junior School Building, both of which have won RIBA architectural awards, and have been identified as amongst the best modern Scottish buildings.

In 2011, the number of buildings and the size of the campus increased with the acquisition of the Mercy Convent site and buildings. The building is used for additional support lessons, as well as a gym for students, offices and a staff room.

The school has a close relationship with the Jesuit parish church of St Aloysius next door. The church is regularly used by the college and Masses offered for both the junior and senior schools. The building is listed category A, designed by C. J. Menart in the baroque revival style and modelled on the Church of the Gesú, original Jesuit headquarters in Rome.

A new Sports Hall was recently constructed on the College campus, and open for use from August 2017. The school's main sports grounds are on the north-eastern outskirts of the city at Millerston.

Headmasters
 Father William Forrester, SJ – ( -1977)
 Father Henry Anthony Richmond, SJ – (1977–1991)
Rev. Dr. James Hanvey SJ (1991–1995)
 Father Adrian Porter, SJ – (1995–2004)
 Mr John E Stoer – (2004–2013)
 Mr John Browne – (2013–2016)
 Mr Matthew Bartlett – (2016–2022)
 Mr Patrick Doyle - (2023-)

Junior School and Kindergarten
St Aloysius' College Kindergarten and Junior School in Glasgow support children from the ages of 3 to 12 years old. The kindergarten is situated in the Mount Building, while the Junior school is in a modern building along Hill Street. As well as attending lessons in the Junior school, the pupils will also receive preparation for the sacraments of Reconciliation, Confirmation and First Holy Communion as part of the school's three-fold tuition for their academic, social and spiritual lives.

Houses
A house system was established by headmaster Fr. Adrian J Porter SJ  in 1997. The four houses, named after notable Jesuit saints, compete against each other in events including rugby, hockey, athletics, inter-house debating and a quiz. Each house also has a housemaster and colour:

Aloysius Gonzaga: Blue
Ignatius Loyola : Red
John Ogilvie: Green
Francis Xavier:  Gold

Under headmaster John E. Stoer, the house system was replaced with the year system, except for sports and chess.
This meant that instead of each house having its own housemaster, each year would have a Head of Year and a Deputy Head of Year.

Previously pupils were divided into 'Romans' and 'Carthaginians' with 'victories' being awarded to pupils for good work. These were totalled at the end of the academic year and overall awarded to the house with the most victories.

As of 2016, there is no longer a Campion House, and instead Gonzaga, named after the patron saint of the school.

Sport
Aloysius' rugby team won the Scottish Rugby U16 Schools' Cup Final in 2016, and in 2022, the U18 1st XV won the schools’ shield final.

Notable former pupils (Old Aloysians or O.A.)

Gallery

See also
 List of Jesuit sites

References

External links

College Handbook
St Aloysius' page on Scottish Schools Online

Educational institutions established in 1859
Member schools of the Headmasters' and Headmistresses' Conference
Jesuit secondary schools in the United Kingdom
Private schools in Glasgow
Category B listed buildings in Glasgow
Listed educational buildings in Scotland
Catholic secondary schools in Glasgow
Catholic primary schools in Scotland
Choirs of children
1859 establishments in Scotland
Jesuit universities and colleges in Scotland